Katarzyna "Kasia" Kowalska (born 13 June 1973) is a Polish singer, songwriter, producer, and actress.

She belongs to the top rung of most frequently broadcast Polish rock artists. Kowalska is one of the best-known Polish vocalists. The estimated sale of all her albums is over one million copies, which puts her among the Polish artists with the largest number of music publishers sold in Poland.

Biography
Her musical experience began in the 1980s when she sang as a female vocalist for numerous Polish bands, including Human, Fatum and Talking Pictures. She began her musical career with the release of her debut album, titled "Gemini", back in 1994. The LP has turned Triple Platinum (around half million copies sold). The album is said to represent her complex personality with the name following her zodiac sign. It is one of the most outstanding albums of Polish rock. In the same year she performed as a support act for Bob Dylan during his two concerts in Poland.

A year later, Kasia went on a tour called "Koncert Inaczej" which consisted of live performances of songs from the "Gemini" album in slightly different versions and jazz recitals during which she performed her favorite jazz standards of Billy Joel, Barbra Streisand etc. The concerts were recorded and realised on an album which had the same title as the tour – "Koncert Inaczej" (which means a concert differently). In the same year, she took part in the Sopot Festival, where she won Grand Prix. One of the judges was Malcolm McLaren.

In 1996, she represented Poland in the Eurovision Song Contest 1996 with a song called Chcę znać swój grzech... and finished 15th out of 23 and received 31 points (including 7 from three countries (Turkey, Greece, and Bosnia and Herzegovina but very few from the other ones). Afterwards, she starred in a movie called Nocne Graffiti and recorded a song for soundtrack of the movie. She also recorded a song to the soundtrack of a Disney movie, The Hunchback of Notre Dame – the prayer of Esmeralda.

Soon after that, she started working on some songs for a third album ( second studio album). With the many changes in her life, a touch of optimism appeared in the new material. The first song which promoted "Czekajac na…" ( Waiting for..) was called "Cos optymistycznego" ( Something optimistic) and it showed a side of Kasia that nobody ever knew existed. The song was very much on the pop-funk side although the album itself was a combination of rock, funk and jazz and a touch of pop only in a few songs. This new style and an image that came with it made Kasia the most popular female polish singer in that year. The large tour for "Czekajac na…" gathered fans from around the country. It was so big, that some people compared it to the Beatles concerts because fans often fainted from exitment. By the end of the tour Kasia announced that she is pregnant ( the father is a composer of a lot of songs on "Czekajac na.." and a known musician- Kostek Yoriadis).

In 1997 premiere has movie "Nocne graffiti" (Night graffiti). Kasia played an 18-year-old drug addict.

On 2 May 1997 she gave birth to her daughter Aleksandra Julia Kowalska.

Summer of 1998 was a time for Kasia's big comeback. She was ready to come back on stage again with the new material. The album "Pelna obaw" ( Full of doubts) was a great surprise for Kasia's devoted fans. Finally after some experimenting with funk and jazz, she came back to her rock roots. The album is actually the most hard core in Kasia's discography. The lyrics are as usual, really personal. They themes : violence in the world and anger towards man. Kasia often said that "Jagged little pill " of Alanis Morissette really inspired her to record an album filled with feminist views. Kasia also produced this album by herself.

The next year and a half was spent on touring and coming up with material for a new album. In 2000 the album "5" came out. Once again Kasia showed a new side of her. This was one of the most important albums to be realised that year in Poland. And probably the most break through material. On "5" the sound is still based on rock music, except that it's enriched with loops and other electronic sounds. And for the first time in her career, Kasia simply sings without going to the extremes of showing all her vocal abilities in one song.

In 2001, she won the MTV Europe Music Award for "Best Polish Artist" and she was invited to sing on a Tribute album to a racing car driver – Ayrton Senna who died tragically in 1994.She wrote the song "Bezpowrotnie" (Irrevocably).

Kasia spent the summer on recording a new album which came out in November 2002. The title – "Antidotum" (Antidote). This time Kasia worked on it with some of her good friends, respected musicians like Michal Grymuza who was also the producer of the album and Wojtek Pilichowski amongst others.The album was a motley in the rock style with a touch of electronic music here and there. It was more dynamic then the previous album. The year 2004 marks 10 years on stage for Kasia Kowalska.Instead of putting out a "best of" package, she recorded an entirely new album called "Samotna w wielkim miescie" (Lonely in a big city).

On 23 June 2008 she gave birth to her second child, son Ignacy Ułanowski.

In November 2008 she released album Antepenultimate promoted by the single A Ty Czego Chcesz (And What Do You Want).

On 7 November 2010, together with an accompanying band, she played a concert in the studio of Agnieszka Osiecka, in which she presented her own interpretations of works by Grzegorz Ciechowski, leader of the Republika band, as well as the producer of her debut album and her musical mentor. Recordings recorded during the concert were released on the album Ciechowski. My blood.

On 12 June 2010 she unveiled the star in the Avenue of Stars at the Polish Song Festival in Opole.

At the 20th Woodstock Festival in 2014, Kasia Kowalska celebrated the 20th anniversary of her debut album. During a night concert at the Academy of Fine Arts (before the official start of the festival), she and the guests presented the most beautiful songs from the first two albums (primarily from the album "Gemini") and covers of artists who inspired her over the years. It was the first "own" concert of Kasia Kowalska at the Woodstock Festival. Earlier Kasia sang on the woodstock stage as a guest: in 2009 (in a special project Woodstock '69), as a guest of Juliette Lewis at her concert, and a year later she took part in the project "Przystanek Republika". On 27 July 2015 Kasia released the album "Przystanek Woodstock 2014" (CD/DVD) which is a record of a concert from 2014.

On 16 August 2018 she performed as part of the Top of the Top Sopot Festival, performing a short recital on the occasion of the 25th anniversary of her artistic work. During the concert, she received the "Top of the Top" award for lifetime achievement.

Her fans had been waiting for 10 years for her last album "Aya". It includes a song "Somewhere Inside" written by Canadian singer Alannah Myles, known for her hit "Black Velvet".

On 25 October 2019 Kasia released album "MTV Unplugged", which is a record of a legendary series concert that took place on 8 May 2019 at the Shakespeare Theater in Gdańsk.

Discography

Singles

Videoclips

Other videoclips 
 1994 – Edyta Bartosiewicz Koziorożec
 1997 – Kasia Nosowska i Kazik Zoil
 2005 – Krzysztof Kiljański i Kayah Prócz ciebie nic
 2012 – Hey Wilk vs kot (impresja Marcina Żabiełowicza)

Other singles and projects 
 1992 – "Hearts" from Genoside Flood and Field (For the Common Man)
 1992 – "The Road", "Epiloque", "Tears for Sorrow", "Song for You" from Talking Pictures Talking Pictures
 1993 – "Demon", "Moja modlitwa", "E-77", "Krzyczę", "Deszczowa piosenka" from Fatum Demon
 1994 – "No Woman No Cry" from Hetman Co jest Grane !?
 1994 – "Gdybyś kochał hej", "Umówiłem się z nim na dziewiątą" from Piersi i przyjaciele 60/70
 1995 – "Modlitwa III – pozwól mi" from Dżem List do R. na 12 głosów vol. 2
 1995 – "Ave Maria”
 1995 – "Zgubiony dom" –  Awantura o Basię
 1996 – "Modlitwa Esmeraldy" –  Dzwonnik z Notre Dame
 1999 – "Mniejsze zło" from Lato Przyjaźń Coca-Cola
 1999 – "Powiedz ile" z from Energy Energy
 1999 – "Chcę zatrzymać ten czas" 
 1999 – "Cicha noc”
 2000 – "Jak w taki dzień deszczowy", "Radość najpiękniejszych lat" from Tyle słońca
 2001 – "Żyć coraz pewniej" from Claudia – miłość rozkwita latem
 2001 – "Goo Goo", "Masz odwagę" from Wojciech Pilichowski Pi
 2002 – "Pomóż mi”
 2009 – "Gdybyś kochał, hej!", "Poszłabym za tobą", "W co mam wierzyć" from Breakout Festiwal 2007 – Wysłuchaj mojej pieśni Panie
 2009 – "Proud Mary", "Whom The Bells Tolls"from  40 lat Woodstock
 2010 – "Twój czas" 
 2011 – "Tak, tak... to ja!", "Nie pytaj o Polskę" from  Projekt Republika – Przystanek Woodstock 2011
 2012 – "Kwiaty we włosach" from Klenczon Legenda
 2012 – "Dni, których nie znamy" from PR3, Święta bez granic
 2012 – "Ikar" 
 2013 – "Niezłomni" from  Panny wyklęte
 2014 – "Wstań i walcz" from Panny wyklęte: wygnane vol. 1
 2017 – "Straciłam swój rozsądek (live)" from  Wojciech Pilichowski – 25 Lat Koncert W Trójce
 2018 – "Zamki na piasku", "Mniej niż zero" from  LP1 Lady Pank i goście
2018 – "Trawnik" Tulia

Filmography 
 1997 – Nocne graffiti

References

External links

  

1973 births
Living people
Eurovision Song Contest entrants of 1996
People from Mińsk County
Eurovision Song Contest entrants for Poland
Sopot International Song Festival winners
Polish pop singers
Polish rock singers
Polish lyricists
21st-century Polish singers
21st-century Polish women singers
MTV Europe Music Award winners